= Super Women =

Publication information
- First comic appearance: 1966
- Created by: Clelia Ferrario and Renato Frascoli

In-story information
- Alter ego: Kristine

Super Women is an Italian fictional superhero comic book character, created by Clelia Ferrario and Renato Frascoli in 1966 for a comic book of the same name. Her real name is Ashley Bowen.

According to the entry in the International Catalogue of Heroes, Super Women's real name is Kristine, and her powers include incredible intellect and hypnotic powers, gained after willingly submitting herself to an experiment.
